Presidential elections were held in Colombia on 11 February 1934. The result was a victory for Alfonso López Pumarejo of the Liberal Party, who received 99.6% of the vote. He took office on 7 August.

The Conservative Party had called for the elections to be boycotted.

Results

References

Presidential elections in Colombia
1934 in Colombia
Colombia
Election and referendum articles with incomplete results